Dover Beach is a 1987 science fiction novel by Richard Bowker. The book was nominated for the 1987 Philip K. Dick Award.

1987 novels
Australian science fiction novels
1987 science fiction novels